The Letona Hotel is a historic former hotel building (now a private residential duplex), between North Hotel and North Spain Streets, just north of Arkansas Highway 310 in Letona, Arkansas.  It is a -story wood-frame structure, with a hip roof and novelty siding.  A two-level porch extends across its eastern facade, supported by square posts.  Built about 1910, it is a surviving reminder of the time when Letona was a major lumber shipment point on the Missouri and North Arkansas Railroad.

The building was listed on the National Register of Historic Places in 1991.

See also
National Register of Historic Places listings in White County, Arkansas

References

Hotel buildings on the National Register of Historic Places in Arkansas
Hotel buildings completed in 1910
National Register of Historic Places in White County, Arkansas
1910 establishments in Arkansas